Typhoon Nida, known in the Philippines as Typhoon Dindo, was the fourth tropical cyclone and second named storm of the 2004 Pacific typhoon season. Forming southeast of the Philippines, the storm strengthened as it moved northwest. The typhoon brushed the eastern Philippines causing heavy rains across the island archipelago. Nida later accelerated northeast, missing Japan to the east while becoming an extratropical cyclone. A total of $1.3 million (2004 USD) in damage occurred, and Nida left 31 fatalities.

Meteorological history

Satellite imagery revealed a weak low-level circulation. Initially, the Joint Typhoon Warning Center (JTWC) forecast the storm to not strengthen. The following day, forecasters saw that the storm was strengthening and upgraded the system to tropical depression status. Forecasters at the Philippine Atmospheric, Geophysical and Astronomical Services Administration designated the storm as Tropical Depression Dindo.

Quickscat satellite imagery showed the depression's winds were near  and increasing. Satellite imagery later the showed deep convection organizing over the low-level circulation. The depression underwent rapid intensification as it became a tropical storm late in the morning on May 14 and was assigned the name Nida by the Japan Meteorological Agency (JMA). Still intensifying, the storm turned northwest where it reached typhoon status later that night.

On May 16, Nida became a super typhoon as its winds reached . At its peak, its highest winds extended  from the center. On May 17, the center of Nida passed over Catanduanes Island, Philippines.

After making landfall, Nida weakened and then turned more northward and slowed down. During the night of May 18, the typhoon began to weaken. Infrared satellite imagery showed the eye being obscured by high cirrostratus clouds, indicative of the weakening typhoon. The eyewall became significantly disorganized as Nida continued to recurve to the northeast.

Interacting with an upper level low pressure system over Japan, the typhoon became elongated. By May 21, Nida transitioned to an extratropical cyclone. The JMA continued to track the remnants of Nida as it weakened northeast of northern Japan.

Preparations and impact

In the Philippines, evacuation centers were opened to accommodate 2,986 people. The typhoon approach cancelled ferry operations stranding 15,057 passengers. In Taiwan, forecasters at the Central Weather Bureau issued a typhoon warning as forecast models predicted a high probability of the typhoon hitting Taiwan. The warnings interrupted the preparations for the inauguration of President Chen Shui-bian.

Structural damage was severe as the typhoon damaged or destroyed over 700–4,000 homes displacing 11,000 people. In Guimba, Nueva Ecija, Nida spawned a tornado that caused moderate damage. After the storm, President Gloria Macapagal Arroyo placed eight providences under a state of emergency.

Nida produced heavy rainfall across the eastern Philippines. The rest of the Philippines received  of rain. 31 fatalities (20 confirmed, 11 unaccounted for) were reported during Nida's landfall. In Camotes island, nine people drowned and five were declared missing when a ferry boat sank during the storm. Elsewhere offshore, 13 crewmen were rescued when their ship ran aground near Luzon. In all, the typhoon left $1.3 million in damage across the eastern Philippines.

In Japan, heavy rains produced by the outer bands of Nida triggered flash flooding and landslides in Fukushima Prefecture. Several highways were shut down due to rising waters or debris and a few homes also were inundated. In Mito, Ibaraki, 360 homes were left without power after high winds knocked down electrical wires. A  section of highway in the city also collapsed. In addition to the structural damage caused by Nida, the poor weather conditions created during its passage resulted in several canceled flights by Japan Air Commuter. There were no reports of damage.

See also

Typhoon Noul (2015)

References

External links

JMA General Information of Typhoon Nida (0402) from Digital Typhoon
JMA Best Track Data of Typhoon Nida (0402) 
JMA Best Track Data (Graphics) of Typhoon Nida (0402)
JMA Best Track Data (Text)
JTWC Best Track Data of Super Typhoon 04W (Nida)
04W.NIDA from the U.S. Naval Research Laboratory

2004 Pacific typhoon season
2004 disasters in the Philippines
Typhoons in the Philippines
Typhoons in Japan
Typhoon Nida
Typhoons
Nida